"Gold" is a song performed by Finnish singer Sandhja. The song was released as a digital download on 7 March 2014, through Sony Music Entertainment Finland as the second single from her debut studio album Gold (2014). The song peaked to number 71 on the Finnish Airplay Chart.

Music video
A music video to accompany the release of "Gold" was first released onto YouTube on 23 April 2014 at a total length of three minutes and fifty seconds.

Track listing

Chart performance

Release history

References

2013 songs
2013 singles
Sandhja songs